Scott Richard Haffner (born February 2, 1966) is an American former professional basketball player. Haffner, a 6'3" (1.90 m) and 180 lb (81½ kg) point guard, played two years in the National Basketball Association (NBA), for the Miami Heat during the 1989–90 season and for the Charlotte Hornets during the 1990–91 season. His best year as a pro came during his rookie year as a member of the Heat, appearing in 43 games (starting 6) and averaging 4.6 ppg. Haffner played collegiately at the University of Illinois and the University of Evansville. Haffner graduated from Noblesville High School in Indiana and was selected by the Heat in the second round (45th pick overall) of the 1989 NBA draft.

Haffner holds Evansville's all-time record for single-game scoring, with 65 points in a 109–83 win over Dayton on February 18, 1989. Only 5 other players have scored more in a single Division 1 game. Haffner won Midwestern Collegiate Conference Player of the Year honors in 1988–89, helping to advance the Purple Aces to the second round of the Division I NCAA men's basketball tournament for the only time in its history. The Aces beat Oregon State 94–90 before falling to Seton Hall 87–73.

Haffner was inducted to the Indiana Basketball Hall of Fame in 2013. In addition to scoring 1,686 points in three seasons at U. of Evansville, he led the Noblesville High School team to an undefeated regular season while averaging 28 points per game his senior year. He set the school’s career scoring (1,380), assists, and single-game scoring (43) records. He was a 1984 Indiana All-Star.

See also
List of NCAA Division I men's basketball players with 60 or more points in a game

External links
NBA stats, basketballreference.com
, ''LA Times"

1966 births
Living people
American men's basketball players
Basketball players from Indiana
Charlotte Hornets players
Evansville Purple Aces men's basketball players
Illinois Fighting Illini men's basketball players
Miami Heat draft picks
Miami Heat players
Point guards
Quad City Thunder players
Sportspeople from Terre Haute, Indiana